Aaron Benjamin (March 2, 1979) is a Canadian former soccer player who played in the United Soccer Leagues, National Professional Soccer League and the Canadian Professional Soccer League.

Playing career 
Benjamin began his professional career in 1999 with the Edmonton Drillers of the National Professional Soccer League, and appeared in five matches and recorded one goal. During the summer season he signed with the Toronto Lynx of the USL A-League. He recorded his first goal on June 1, 2000 in a 4-1 victory over the Connecticut Wolves. In his first season with Toronto he recorded five goals and assisted the club by reaching the postseason the second time in the club's history. He appeared in all the matches in the postseason, but were eliminated from competition by the Rochester Rhinos. He was re-signed to a new contract by Toronto on April 24, 2001. Unfortunately he had a disappointing season without registering a single goal throughout the season. In 2002, he appeared in one match for the club and subsequently was released from his contract.

Following his release he signed with Mississauga Olympians of the Canadian Professional Soccer League, and making his debut on May 24, 2002 in a match against the York Region Shooters. He helped the Olympians finish second in the Western Conference and thus secure a postseason berth. In 2003, Benjamin signed with the Metro Lions and his best result with the club came in 2004, where he assisted the team by finishing second in the Eastern Conference, and reaching the quarterfinals in the playoffs.

References 

1979 births
Living people
Soccer people from Ontario
Association football forwards
Canadian soccer players
Black Canadian soccer players
Canadian Soccer League (1998–present) players
Toronto (Mississauga) Olympians players
Toronto Lynx players
A-League (1995–2004) players
Edmonton Drillers (1996–2000) players
National Professional Soccer League (1984–2001) players
Brampton United players